Elapomorphus quinquelineatus, Raddi's lizard-eating snake,  is a species of snake of the family Colubridae. The species is found in Brazil.

References

Elapomorphus
Endemic fauna of Brazil
Reptiles of Brazil
Reptiles described in 1820
Taxa named by Giuseppe Raddi